Joachim Joseph A. Campos (1893 – 13 May 1945), also known as J.J.A. Campos, was a writer, editor, and took an active interest in history. He is known for his book History of the Portuguese in Bengal, which according to the historian Dr. Teotonio R. De Souza remains "still a classic".

Description of the author
In his 1919-published magnum opus, the Campos is described as the joint editor of The Century Review, member of the Asiatic Society of Calcutta, "etc, etc". Campos traced his roots to the Portuguese colony of Goa, so while technically he was Portuguese during that era, he was also of South Asian or Indian (Goan) ethnicity.

Critical response
Reviewing his most-ambitious work in 1919, The Spectator wrote:

Personal life
According to a general notice issued by the Supreme Court of Kenya's probate and administration section (cause no. 114 of 1947), Joaquim Joseph Campos of Kenya died in Bangkok, Thailand on 13 May 1945, and his widow was Matilde Campos.

References

External links
Full text of The Portuguese in Bengal, by JAA Campos, available for free download in multiple formats.

Portuguese writers
1893 births
1945 deaths
Historians of India